Roberto Mateos (born April 28, 1963, in Mexico City, Distrito Federal, Mexico), is a Mexican actor of telenovelas. He is best known for his performance in most successful telenovelas productions such as Televisa, Venevision and Telemundo. He lives in Mexico City and Miami with wife and son.

Filmography

Films

Television

References

External links 

1963 births
Living people
Mexican male telenovela actors
Mexican male television actors
Mexican male film actors
Male actors from Mexico City
20th-century Mexican male actors
21st-century Mexican male actors
People from Mexico City
Mexican people of Hungarian descent